Les Misérables is a 1909 American silent historical drama proto-feature film (four short films that can be seen separately as a series, but when combined resemble a full-length feature film).  The proto-feature movie is based on the 1862 French novel of the same name by Victor Hugo, and stars Maurice Costello and William V. Ranous. It was directed by J. Stuart Blackton.

Distributed by the Vitagraph Company of America, the film consists of four reels. The reels were released over the course of three months, from September 4 to November 27, 1909.

Plot
The film relates the lives of the French people during 20 years in the 19th century. The story focuses on Jean Valjean (Costello), an honest man who is running from an obsessive police inspector chasing him for an insignificant offense. Valjean escapes being incarcerated.

Cast
 William V. Ranous as Javert
 Maurice Costello as Jean Valjean
 Hazel Neason
 Marc McDermott

See also
 Adaptations of Les Misérables

References

External links
 

1909 films
1900s historical drama films
American historical drama films
American silent feature films
American black-and-white films
Films based on Les Misérables
Films directed by J. Stuart Blackton
Vitagraph Studios films
1900s American films
Silent American drama films